Nonkululeko Mlaba (born 27 June 2000) is a South African cricketer who plays as a slow left-arm orthodox bowler. She made her international debut for the South Africa women's cricket team in September 2019.

Career
In September 2019, she was named in South Africa's squad for their series against India. She made her Women's Twenty20 International (WT20I) debut for South Africa, against India, on 24 September 2019. In January 2020, she was named in South Africa's Women's One Day International (WODI) squad for their series against New Zealand. Later the same month, she was named in South Africa's squad for the 2020 ICC Women's T20 World Cup in Australia. In July 2020, Mlaba was named newcomer of the year at Cricket South Africa's annual awards ceremony.

On 23 July 2020, Mlaba was named in South Africa's 24-woman squad to begin training in Pretoria, ahead of their tour to England. In January 2021, she was named in South Africa's Women's One Day International (WODI) squad for their series against Pakistan. She made her WODI debut for South Africa, against Pakistan, on 20 January 2021.

In February 2022, she was named in South Africa's team for the 2022 Women's Cricket World Cup in New Zealand. In May 2022, Cricket South Africa awarded Mlaba with her first central contract, ahead of the 2022–23 season. In June 2022, Mlaba was named in South Africa's Women's Test squad for their one-off match against England Women. She made her Test debut on 27 June 2022, for South Africa against England.

In July 2022, she was named in South Africa's team for the cricket tournament at the 2022 Commonwealth Games in Birmingham, England.

References

External links

 
 

2000 births
Living people
Place of birth missing (living people)
South African women cricketers
South Africa women Test cricketers
South Africa women One Day International cricketers
South Africa women Twenty20 International cricketers
KwaZulu-Natal Coastal women cricketers
Cricketers at the 2022 Commonwealth Games
Commonwealth Games competitors for South Africa